The 2012 FIVB Volleyball Men's Club World Championship was the 8th edition of the event. It was held in Doha, Qatar from 13 to 19 October 2012.

Qualification

Pools composition

Squads

Venue

Pool standing procedure
 Match points
 Number of matches won
 Sets ratio
 Points ratio
 Result of the last match between the tied teams

Match won 3–0 or 3–1: 3 match points for the winner, 0 match points for the loser
Match won 3–2: 2 match points for the winner, 1 match point for the loser

Preliminary round
All times are Arabia Standard Time (UTC+03:00).

Pool A

|}

|}

Pool B

|}

|}

Final round
All times are Arabia Standard Time (UTC+03:00).

Semifinals

|}

3rd place match

|}

Final

|}

Final standing

Awards

Most Valuable Player
 Osmany Juantorena (Trentino Diatec)
Best Scorer
 Aleksandar Atanasijević (PGE Skra Bełchatów)
Best Spiker
 Jan Štokr (Trentino Diatec)
Best Blocker
 Emanuele Birarelli (Trentino Diatec)

Best Server
 Wallace de Souza (Sada Cruzeiro)
Best Setter
 William Arjona (Sada Cruzeiro)
Best Receiver
 Sérgio Nogueira (Sada Cruzeiro)
Best Libero
 Sérgio Nogueira (Sada Cruzeiro)

External links
Official website
Final Standing
Awards

2012 FIVB Men's Club World Championship
FIVB Men's Club World Championship
FIVB Men's Club World Championship
FIVB Volleyball Men's Club World Championship
Sports competitions in Doha